Claudia Julieta Ramírez Valdez (born July 30, 1964) is a Mexican actress.

Filmography

Film roles

Television roles

Awards and nominations

Premios TVyNovelas

References

External links

 Claudia Ramírez at the esmas 
 Claudia Ramírez at the alma latina

1964 births
Living people
Mexican telenovela actresses
Mexican television actresses
Mexican film actresses
20th-century Mexican actresses
21st-century Mexican actresses
Actresses from Veracruz
People from Minatitlán, Veracruz